The 2016 Campeonato Internacional de Tenis de Santos was a professional tennis tournament played on clay courts. It was the sixth edition of the tournament which was part of the 2016 ATP Challenger Tour. It took place in Santos, Brazil between 19 and 25 September 2016.

Singles main-draw entrants

Seeds

 1 Rankings as of September 12, 2016.

Other entrants
The following players received wildcards into the singles main draw:
  Felipe Meligeni Alves
  Osni Junior
  Rafael Matos
  Thiago Seyboth Wild

The following players received entry into the singles main draw with a protected ranking:
  Fabiano de Paula

The following players received entry from the qualifying draw:
  Oscar José Gutierrez
  Fabrício Neis
  Eduardo Dischinger
  Caio Silva

Champions

Singles

 Renzo Olivo def.   Thiago Monteiro 6–4, 7–6(7–5).

Doubles

 Sergio Galdós /  Máximo González def.  Rogério Dutra Silva /  Fabrício Neis 6–3, 5–7, [14–12].

External links
Official Website

References

Campeonato Internacional de Tenis de Santos
Campeonato Internacional de Tenis de Santos